Bohdan Valentynovych Porokh (born 5 August 2000) is a Ukrainian professional footballer who plays as a centre-back for Ukrainian club Metalist Kharkiv.

References

External links
 Profile on Metalist Kharkiv official website
 

2000 births
Living people
Ukrainian footballers
People from Pavlohrad
Association football central defenders
MFC Mykolaiv players
MFC Mykolaiv-2 players
FC Metalist Kharkiv players
Ukrainian First League players
Ukrainian Second League players
Sportspeople from Dnipropetrovsk Oblast